Bartley Water is a two-branch small river in the New Forest district of Hampshire, England. It drains the north and north-east of the New Forest National Park up to the A31 road, a watershed and two villages against the north-east side of the park.

Its two upper branches unite in Bartley from where it flows north-east to Eling where it becomes a narrow tidal estuary into the Southampton Water which is an arm of the Solent.

The tidal part of the river (but not the natural low water flow) drives the working historic Eling Tide Mill at Eling, where a toll road crosses the river.

The river is also an important recreational and wildlife haven, especially at the tidal, Eling end of the river.

Its farthest source is the Mill Stream, which is the main contributor to its south branch and rises north-west of Lyndhurst, Hampshire.

References

Rivers of Hampshire
1Bartley